Lake Chelan is a long, glacially-carved lake in the central part of the North Cascades mountain range in northwestern Washington State.  Via the short Chelan River, it is tributary to the Okanogan River, a tributary of the Columbia.  Access to points along the lake has been primarily by water, and in the early 1900s, this was done by steamboat.  Located at the head of the lake is Stehekin, a resort  community.

External links

Photographs
steamer Stehekin on Lake Chelan, July, 1902
more steamboats and dock on Lake Chelan
steamer Flyer on Lake Chelan
excellent overview of steamboat landing on Lake Chelan, showing steamboats at docks
mail boat Tourist on Lake Chelan

References

History of Washington (state)
Transportation in Chelan County, Washington
Steamboats of Washington (state)
Chelan